Chad Christensen may refer to:

 Chad Christensen (Idaho politician), member of the Idaho House of Representatives
 Chad Christensen (Nevada politician), member of the Nevada State Assembly